Brenton Robyn Miels (12 January 1948 – 19 October 1997) was an Australian rules footballer who played for Sturt in the South Australian National Football League (SANFL) from 1965 until 1968 and then again from 1970 to 1977 during which time he played in Premiership sides in 1966, 1967, 1968, 1970, 1974 and 1976. Miels played on the wing and kicked 98 goals for Sturt. He was made a player life member of Sturt in 1973, Player Life Member of the SANFL in 1975 and was posthumously inducted into the Sturt Football Club Hall of Fame in 2009.

Miels played with the Richmond Football Club in the Victorian Football League (VFL) from 1969 to 1970 whilst serving national service with the Australian Army.

References
Holmesby, Russell & Main, Jim (2007). The Encyclopedia of AFL Footballers. 7th ed. Melbourne: Bas Publishing.
Hogan P: The Tigers Of Old, Richmond FC, Melbourne 1996

1948 births
1997 deaths
Australian rules footballers from South Australia
Sturt Football Club players
Richmond Football Club players
People from Laura, South Australia